is a Japanese tarento and Yobikō lecturer.

Hayashi is a full-time lecturer at Toshin High School Satellite Prep School Language Arts. He teaches modern language. Hayashi is represented with Watanabe Entertainment.

Bibliography

Filmography

Regular programmes

Current appearances

Former appearances

Guest appearances

Radio

Advertisements

Events

Magazines

Newspapers

Internet

News websites

References

Notes

External links
 
Toshin High School profile 
Heiwa presents Osamu Hayashi no Rekka no Honō Juku 

Japanese television personalities
Japanese television presenters
People from Nagoya
University of Tokyo alumni
1965 births
Living people
Watanabe Entertainment